Eberau (derived from "mogyoró"=hazelnut, "kerek"=round) is a town in the Austrian state of Burgenland in the district of Güssing.

Population

References

External links 
 Eberau
 To see coat of arms

Gallery 

Cities and towns in Güssing District
Erdődy family